This is a list of all the groups the Royal Australian Air Force has organised since it was established.

World War II-era groups
No. 1 Group RAAF
No. 1 (Training) Group RAAF
No. 2 Group RAAF
No. 2 (Training) Group RAAF
No. 4 (Maintenance) Group RAAF
No. 5 (Maintenance) Group RAAF
No. 9 (Operational) Group RAAF
No. 10 (Operational) Group RAAF
No. 11 Group RAAF

Modern Force Element Groups (FEGs)
Aerospace Operational Support Group RAAF
Air Combat Group RAAF
Air Force Training Group RAAF
Air Lift Group RAAF
Air Mobility Group RAAF
Combat Support Group RAAF
Maritime Patrol Group RAAF
Strike Reconnaissance Group RAAF
Surveillance and Control Group RAAF
Surveillance and Response Group RAAF
Tactical Fighter Group RAAF
Tactical Transport Group RAAF

See also
RAAF area commands

Notes

References
 
 
 

 
Australian Air Force groups
Royal Australian Air Force groups
Royal Australian Air Force lists